Alex Borg (born 5 June 1969 in Mellieha) is a Maltese former professional snooker player. Borg currently resides in Mellieha, Malta.

Career
Borg first turned professional in 1991, and regularly appeared as a wild card in the Malta Grand Prix, where throughout the event's history he defeated players including Nigel Bond and John Higgins. His best performances were reaching the semi-final in 1997 and 1998. He also competed as a wild card in the Malta Cup. However, in ranking events he has not had such success, his best finish being to the last 64, he has achieved this on three occasions, all in the Grand Prix. He has won the EBSA European Snooker Championships twice, the first in 2005 where he beat Kristján Helgason 7–2 in the final, and the following year when he beat Jeff Cundy 7–5.

In 2016, Alex Borg won against Alexander Ursenbacher in Q-School Event 2 to gain a two-year tour card. He endured a difficult opening to the 2016/17 season, losing his first eight matches on tour. His best win of the season was a 5–1 victory over Jack Lisowski at the 2017 China Open.

In June 2019, Borg came through Q-School - Event 3 by winning six matches to earn a two-year card on the World Snooker Tour for the 2019–20 and 2020–21 seasons. In 2019, the Maltese Billiard and Snooker Association (MBSA) announced that he will be the captain of the Maltese Team during the 2019 World Cup held in China alongside his teammate Brian Cini. He also represented Malta with Tony Drago and Duncan Bezzina during the past years.

In 2021, Alex Borg ended his career as a professional snooker player after being dropped from the tour. Despite this, he still plays snooker in his home country and till date, he is currently recognised as one of the most active players affiliated with the Malta Billiards & Snooker Association.

Performance and ranking timeline

Career finals

Amateur finals: 29 (16 titles)

References

External links

Alex Borg at worldsnooker.com
Profile on the Global Snooker Centre

Maltese snooker players
Maltese pool players
1969 births
Living people
Competitors at the 2013 World Games
People from Mellieħa